Harradence is a surname. Notable people with the surname include:

Milt Harradence (1922–2008), Canadian criminal lawyer, pilot, politician, and judge
Rita Harradence (1915–2012), Australian biochemist